Men's Downhill World Cup 1981/1982

Calendar

Final point standings

In Men's Downhill World Cup 1981/82 the best 5 results count. The same tie-breaking rule in effect in 1977 were still in effect—best sixth score. Thus, Canada's Steve Podborski was awarded the season title and discipline trophy over two-time winner Peter Müller by having a better sixth score (12, for a fourth-place finish, compared to 10, for a sixth-place finish).

Men's Downhill Team Results

All points were shown including individuel deduction. bold indicate highest score - italics indicate race wins

References
 fis-ski.com

External links
 

World Cup
FIS Alpine Ski World Cup men's downhill discipline titles